USS Caravan (AM-157) was an  built for the United States Navy during World War II and in commission from 1944 to 1945. In 1945, she was transferred to the Soviet Union and after that served in the Soviet Navy as T-337.

Construction and commissioning
Originally classified as a "coastal minesweeper," AMc-134, Caravan was reclassified as a "minesweeper," AM-157, on 21 February 1942. She was launched on 27 October 1942 at Portland, Oregon, by Willamette Iron and Steel Works and commissioned on 21 January 1944.

Service history

U.S. Navy, World War II, 1944-1945
Caravan stood out of San Francisco, California, on 25 March 1944, bound for Pearl Harbor in the Territory of Hawaii and Majuro and Eniwetok in the Marshall Islands. She arrived at Eniwetok on 25 April 1944 and began operations as a patrol vessel, lifeguard for aviators downed during aircraft carrier strikes, and convoy escort. Her escort duties took her throughout the Mariana Islands, and in September 1944 she was rebased there at Guam. She moved to Ulithi in October 1944 – riding out a severe typhoon en route – to begin operations in the Palau Islands as well as the Marianas.

Selected for transfer to the Soviet Navy in Project Hula – a secret program for the transfer of U.S. Navy ships to the Soviet Navy at Cold Bay, Territory of Alaska, in anticipation of the Soviet Union joining the war against Japan – Caravan arrived at Portland, Oregon, in May 1945 for a pre-transfer overhaul. In July 1945 she arrived at Cold Bay to train her new Soviet crew.

Soviet Navy, 1945-1960

Following the completion of training for her Soviet crew, Caravan was decommissioned on 17 August 1945 at Cold Bay and transferred to the Soviet Union under Lend-Lease immediately. She soon departed Cold Bay bound for Petropavlovsk-Kamchatsky in the Soviet Union, where she served in the Soviet Far East.

In February 1946, the United States began negotiations for the return of ships loaned to the Soviet Union for use during World War II, and on 8 May 1947, United States Secretary of the Navy James V. Forrestal informed the United States Department of State that the United States Department of the Navy wanted 480 of the 585 combatant ships it had transferred to the Soviet Union for World War II use returned. Deteriorating relations between the two countries as the Cold War broke out led to protracted negotiations over the ships, and by the mid-1950s the U.S. Navy found it too expensive to bring home ships that had become worthless to it anyway. Many ex-American ships were merely administratively "returned" to the United States and instead sold for scrap in the Soviet Union, while the U.S. Navy did not seriously pursue the return of others because it viewed them as no longer worth the cost of recovery. The Soviet Union never returned Caravan to the United States, although the U.S. Navy reclassified her as a "fleet minesweeper" (MSF) and redesignated her MSF-157 on 7 February 1955.

Disposal
T-337 was scrapped in 1960. Unaware of her fate, the U.S. Navy kept Caravan on its Naval Vessel Register until finally striking her on 1 January 1983.

References

External links 
 NavSource Online: Mine Warfare Vessel Photo Archive - Caravan (MSF-157) - ex-AM-157 - ex-AMc-134

Admirable-class minesweepers
Ships built in Portland, Oregon
1942 ships
World War II minesweepers of the United States
Admirable-class minesweepers of the Soviet Navy
World War II minesweepers of the Soviet Union
Cold War minesweepers of the Soviet Union
Ships transferred under Project Hula